Sirius Knoll is a conspicuous ice-covered knoll, 1,010 m, situated  2.28 km north-northeast of Mount Schuyler and marking the northeast end of Detroit Plateau in the central part of Trinity Peninsula in Antarctica.  Surmounting Russell West Glacier to the north. Charted in 1946 by the Falkland Islands Dependencies Survey (FIDS) and named after Sirius, the dog star.

Map
 Trinity Peninsula. Scale 1:250000 topographic map No. 5697. Institut für Angewandte Geodäsie and British Antarctic Survey, 1996.

References
 SCAR Composite Antarctic Gazetteer.

Hills of Trinity Peninsula